Frank LeDuke McGrath (March 13, 1904 – March 4, 1990) was an American football player. 

A native of Hampton, Michigan, McGrath played college football for Georgetown. He played professional football in the National Football League (NFL) for the Frankford Yellow Jackets during 1927 season and for the New York Yankees during the 1928 season. He played at the end position and appeared in a total of 24 NFL games, 18 as a starter.

References

1904 births
1990 deaths
American football ends
Georgetown Hoyas football players
Frankford Yellow Jackets players
New York Yankees (NFL) players
Players of American football from Michigan